Claire Anderson née Claire Walker (born 1992) is a Scottish international lawn bowler.

Bowls career
She has won the indoor National triples in 2015 and 2018, the indoor pairs in 2016, the British indoor triples in 2016 and the pairs in 2017.

In 2020 she was selected for the 2020 World Outdoor Bowls Championship in Australia.

Personal life
In 2019 she married former indoor world champion Stewart Anderson.

References

Scottish female bowls players
Living people
1992 births